Anicka Delgado (born 13 June 2002) is an Ecuadorian swimmer. She competed in the women's 50 metre butterfly and women's 100 metre freestyle events at the 2019 World Aquatics Championships held in Gwangju, South Korea. In both events she did not advance to compete in the semi-finals.

She competed at the 2020 Summer Olympics.

Delgado competes collegiately for the University of Southern California. She is the daughter of swimmer Felipe Delgado.

References

External links
 

2002 births
Living people
Ecuadorian female swimmers
Place of birth missing (living people)
Swimmers at the 2018 Summer Youth Olympics
Swimmers at the 2019 Pan American Games
Swimmers at the 2020 Summer Olympics
Olympic swimmers of Ecuador
Ecuadorian female freestyle swimmers
Female butterfly swimmers
Pan American Games competitors for Ecuador
USC Trojans swimming and diving
21st-century Ecuadorian women